John Baynham (born 1565), was an English politician.

He was a Member (MP) of the Parliament of England for Queenborough in 1593.

References

1565 births
Year of death missing
English MPs 1593